Gulyabani is a 2014 Turkish horror-comedy film directed by Orçun Benli. According to Turkish myth, Gulyabani is a humongous ghoul with a long beard who wanders at night and scares people.

References

External links
 
 

Films set in Turkey
Turkish comedy horror films
Turkish fantasy films
2014 comedy horror films
2010s monster movies